

Births and deaths

Births
 Liam O'Flynn (1950)
 Frankie Gavin (1956)

Deaths
 Johnny Doran (1907–1950)
 Elizabeth Cronin (1879–1956)

Recordings
 1954 "Cucanandy-Nandy" (Elizabeth Cronin)
 1958 "The Rising of the Moon" (The Clancy Brothers)
 1958 "Her Mantle So Green" (Margaret Barry)
 1959 "The Bunch Of Roses" (Seamus Ennis)

1950